Midnight Train may refer to:
Midnight Train (film), a 2013 Chinese film
"The Midnight Train", a traditional African-American song published by Dorothy Scarborough and by Carl Sandburg; recorded by Dan Zanes and others
Midnight Train, an album by Jorja Chalmers (2021)
"Midnight Train", a song by Bryan Ferry from Avonmore
"Midnight Train", a song by Buddy Guy from Heavy Love (1998)
"Midnight Train", a song by The Charlie Daniels Band from Homesick Heroes
"Midnight Train", a song by Chet Atkins and The Country All-Stars from Jazz from the Hills
"Midnight Train", a song by Ludacris from Incognegro
"Midnight Train", a song by The Monkees from Changes
"Midnight Train", a song by The Rock and Roll Trio
"Midnight Train", a song by Sau
"Midnight Train", a song by Sam Smith from The Thrill of It All
"Midnight Train", a song by The Three Degrees from International
"Midnight Train", a song that appeared in Nickelodeon's cartoon ChalkZone in the episode "Double Trouble"
”Midnight Train”, a song by Sauti Sol
Midnight Trains, a French railroad company

See also
Bridge and torch problem or The Midnight Train and Dangerous crossing, a logic puzzle
List of train songs
Midnight Meat Train, a 2008 horror film
The Midnight Special (train)
"Midnight Train to Georgia", a song by Gladys Knight & the Pips
Midnight Train to Georgia (album), a 1995 album by Cissy Houston
Riding the Midnight Train, an American folk music anthology album
"Don't Stop Believin'", a song by Journey using the term "midnight train" twice